Bandon State Natural Area is a state park in the U.S. state of Oregon. It is administered by the Oregon Parks and Recreation Department. The Oregon Coast Trail passes through the park.

The park is open year-round; annual day-use visitation is about 27,000. Amenities include beach access, hiking trails, birdwatching spots, fishing access, restrooms, parking, and picnic tables.

Three separate entrances lead to separate parking areas within the park. The two to the south offer beach access but no other amenities. The third, Devil's Kitchen, has picnic tables, seating benches, paths to the beach, and restrooms.

See also
 List of Oregon state parks

References

State parks of Oregon
Parks in Coos County, Oregon